Robel Teklemichael Bahta (Tigrinya: ሮቤል ተኽለሚካኤል; born 11 July 2000) is an Eritrean professional footballer who plays as a defender for Ethiopian Premier League club Ethiopian Coffee and captains the Eritrea national team.

Club career
In April 2021 Teklemichael left domestic club Red Sea FC and joined Ethiopian Coffee of the Ethiopian Premier League. By signing the deal, Teklemichael became the second Eritrean player to join an      Ethiopian club (after Samyoma Alexander) following the 2018 Eritrea–Ethiopia summit.

International career
In December 2018 Teklemichael was part of the Eritrea youth team that beat South Sudan 3–0. He was named Man of the Match following the friendly victory. He made his senior international debut on 4 September 2019 in a 2022 FIFA World Cup qualification match against Namibia. 

Later that month Teklemichael took part in the 2019 CECAFA U-20 Championship, the first regional tournament in which the team participated in a decade. The team went on to win the bronze medal overall with Teklemichael serving as the team captain. He scored two goals in the group stage of the tournament, one against Sudan and the other against Djibouti.

Because of his performance at the Under-20 Championship, Teklemichael was called up for the 2019 CECAFA Cup later that year. He once again captained the Eritrea side that went on to win the silver medal, losing to Uganda in the final. Teklemichael was named the tournament's Most Valuable Player for his performance.

In July 2021 he Teklemichael captained his national side once again, this time at the 2021 CECAFA U-23 Challenge Cup.

Career statistics

References

External links
 
 
 
 Soccer.et profile

Living people
2000 births
Eritrean footballers
Association football defenders
Eritrea international footballers
Eritrean Premier League players
Red Sea FC players
Ethiopian Coffee S.C. players
Eritrean expatriate footballers
Eritrean expatriate sportspeople in Ethiopia
Expatriate footballers in Ethiopia